His Lordship is a 1932 British musical comedy film directed by Michael Powell. It was made as a Quota quickie.

Plot
Cheerful Cockney Bert Gibbs inherits a title from his father and becomes Lord Thornton Heath. However, then he meets up with movie star Ilya Myona and when his mother asks about her, Bert implies they are engaged. After some adventures with some dubious Russian types, Bert's girl Lenina eventually wins him back.

Cast
 Jerry Verno as Bert Gibbs aka Albert Lord Thornheath
 Ben Welden as Washington Roosevelt Lincoln
 Polly Ward as Leninia
 Peter Gawthorne as Ferguson, the Butler
 Muriel George as Mrs. Emma Gibbs
 Michael Hogan as Comrade Curzon
 V.C. Clinton-Baddeley as Comrade Howard

Subsequent history
His Lordship was declared to be "Missing, Believed Lost" by the British Film Institute, but a copy was subsequently found. It was put onto safety film and shown at the NFT in 2000. It proved popular with audiences as a camp classic.

References

Notes

Bibliography

 Chibnal, Steve. Quota Quickies : The Birth of the British 'B' Film. London: BFI, 2007. 
 Powell, Michael. A Life in Movies: An Autobiography. London: Heinemann, 1986. .

External links

His Lordship reviews and articles at the Powell & Pressburger Pages

1932 films
1932 musical comedy films
British musical comedy films
British black-and-white films
Films directed by Michael Powell
Films by Powell and Pressburger
Quota quickies
Films scored by Richard Addinsell
1930s rediscovered films
Rediscovered British films
1930s English-language films
1930s British films